Eupoecilia ochrotona is a species of moth of the family Tortricidae. It is found on Bali in Indonesia.

References

Moths described in 1968
Eupoecilia